Sean Francis Bobbitt, B.S.C. (born 29 November 1958) is an American-born British cinematographer.

Early life
Sean Bobbitt was born in Corpus Christi, Texas on 29 November 1958.

Career
Bobbitt started his career as a news and documentary cameraman, a role which took him to the most conflicted spots of the globe.

In 2008, Bobbitt worked with artist-turned-director Steve McQueen on British film Hunger, a hard-hitting film about the Northern Irish hunger striker, Bobby Sands. With this film Bobbitt, McQueen, editor Joe Walker and actor Michael Fassbender formed a collaborative award-winning team that have gone on to make a further two films, Shame and 12 Years a Slave. Bobbitt won a BIFA in 2008 for his work on Hunger. He was again nominated in 2011 for Shame, starring Academy Award nominee Carey Mulligan alongside Fassbender. In 2012, Bobbitt won the Carlo Di Palma European Cinematographer of the Year Award at the European Film Awards for his work on Shame.

In 2011, Bobbitt worked on the pilot of HBO's acclaimed series Game of Thrones. The following year, Bobbitt completed filming on The Place Beyond the Pines, which stars Ryan Gosling, Bradley Cooper, Eva Mendes and Ray Liotta, a film starring Saoirse Ronan, Gemma Arterton and Jonny Lee Miller called Byzantium, and he concluded five years of working on Michael Winterbottom drama-film Everyday. In early 2013, he completed work on Oldboy, the Spike Lee-directed American remake of the 2003 South Korean film of the same name. The end of 2013 saw the release of 12 Years a Slave, for which he received multiple cinematography award nominations, and which ultimately won the coveted Best Picture Award at the 2014 Oscars.

Over the next few years, he worked on Kill the Messenger with Jeremy Renner, Rock the Kasbah with Bill Murray, Queen of Katwe with David Oyelowo, On Chesil Beach with Saoirce Ronan, Stronger with Jake Gyllenhaal. In 2018, he collaborated with McQueen again on heist movie Widows.

In 2019, he shot Judas and the Black Messiah for which he was nominated for the Academy Award for Best Cinematography. The film was released on HBO Max in 2021, having been postponed due to the COVID-19 pandemic.

In 2021, Bobbitt filmed The Marvels, directed by Nia DiCosta.

Filmography

Film

Television

Short films

References

External links
 
 Interview with Bright Lights Film Journal

1958 births
Living people
People from Corpus Christi, Texas
American cinematographers
British cinematographers
European Film Award for Best Cinematographer winners
Independent Spirit Award winners